Machines of Grace is the first studio album by Machines of Grace.

Track listing 
 "Just a Game" – 04:59 	 
 "Psychotic" – 04:05 	 
 "Fly Away" – 03:33 	 
 "Innocence" – 04:21 	 
 "The Moment" – 04:39 	 
 "Between the Lines" – 04:50 	 
 "This Time" – 04:31 	 
 "Breakdown" – 04:12 	 
 "Soul to Fire" – 04:36 	 
 "Promises" – 04:55 	 
 "Bleed" – 04:22 	 
 "Better Days" – 03:54 	 
 "This Time (Acoustic)" – 02:56

Personnel 
 Zachary Stevens – lead vocals, keyboards
 Chris Rapoza – bass
 Matt Leff – guitars
 Jeff Plate – drums

External links 
 Machines of Grace official website
 Machines of Grace on Encyclopaedia Metallum

2009 debut albums
Machines of Grace albums